The Ven. George Frost (b 4 April 1935) is an Anglican priest.

Frost was educated at Durham University and Lincoln Theological College; and ordained in 1961. After a curacy at St Margaret, Barking he held incumbencies at Marks Gate, Tipton, Penn and Tong. He was appointed a prebendary of Lichfield Cathedral in 1985, Archdeacon of Salop in 1987  and Archdeacon of Lichfield in 1998. He retired in 2000.

Notes

1935 births
Alumni of Hatfield College, Durham
Alumni of Lincoln Theological College
Archdeacons of Salop
Archdeacons of Stafford
Living people